Thea Culley (born January 2, 1986, in Trail, British Columbia) is a female field hockey player, who played for the Canada national field hockey team as a forward at the 2014 Commonwealth Games.

Culley represented Canada at the 2015 Pan American Games where the team won a bronze medal.

References

Living people
Canadian female field hockey players
Commonwealth Games competitors for Canada
Field hockey people from British Columbia
Field hockey players at the 2014 Commonwealth Games
Field hockey players at the 2015 Pan American Games
Pan American Games bronze medalists for Canada
Sportspeople from Trail, British Columbia
Pan American Games medalists in field hockey
1986 births
Medalists at the 2015 Pan American Games